Francesca Schiavone defeated Samantha Stosur in the final, 6–4, 7–6(7–2) to win the women's singles tennis title at the 2010 French Open. It was her first and only major singles title, and she became the first Italian woman to win a singles major. Schiavone was also the first woman in the Open Era to win the title without being a top-10 seed. The final was also a rematch of the pair's first round match from the previous year. With the win, Schiavone made her top 10 debut in the rankings. Schiavone remains the last woman with a one-handed backhand to win a singles major.

Svetlana Kuznetsova was the defending champion, but lost in the third round to Maria Kirilenko.

This tournament marked the last French Open appearance of four-time champion Justine Henin, who was defeated by Stosur in the fourth round. It was also the major debut of future world No. 1 and two-time major champion Simona Halep, who was defeated by Stosur in the first round.

With the loss of Serena Williams in the quarterfinals, a maiden major champion was guaranteed. This was the first major since the 1979 Australian Open where none of the semifinalists had previously won a major title, and the final was the first since the 2004 tournament to feature two first-time major finalists.

Seeds

Qualifying

Draw

Finals

Top half

Section 1

Section 2

Section 3

Section 4

Bottom half

Section 5

Section 6

Section 7

Section 8

Championship match statistics

External links
Main Draw
2010 French Open – Women's draws and results at the International Tennis Federation

References

Women's Singles
French Open by year – Women's singles
French Open - Women's Singles
2010 in women's tennis
2010 in French women's sport